Scandal in Baden-Baden (German: Skandal in Baden-Baden) is a 1929 German silent film directed by Erich Waschneck and starring Brigitte Helm, Ernst Stahl-Nachbaur and Henry Stuart.

The film's sets were designed by the art director Erich Czerwonski.

Cast
 Brigitte Helm as Vera Kersten  
 Ernst Stahl-Nachbaur as John Leeds  
 Henry Stuart as Baron Egon von Halden  
 Lili Alexandra as Fernande Besson  
 Leo Peukert as Edgar Merck  
 Rudolf Biebrach as Juwelier Hess  
 Albert Karchow as Makler Urban  
 Walter von Allwoerden as Sekretär  
 Anna von Palen as Wirtin  
 Adolf E. Licho as Agent  
 Otto Kronburger as Kommissar

References

Bibliography
 Hans-Michael Bock and Tim Bergfelder. The Concise Cinegraph: An Encyclopedia of German Cinema. Berghahn Books.

External links

1929 films
Films of the Weimar Republic
Films directed by Erich Waschneck
German silent feature films
UFA GmbH films
German black-and-white films